The Bugojno Coal Mine is a brown coal mine with headquarter in Bugojno in Central Bosnia Canton.  The open pit mine in village Gračanica has coal reserves amounting to 1.29 billion tonnes of lignite. The mine has an annual production capacity of 0.3 million tonnes of coal.

References 

Coal mines in Bosnia and Herzegovina
Bugojno